The Barbados Cricket Association is the ruling body for cricket in Barbados. The BCA was established in 1933 by an Act of Parliament to replace the Barbados Cricket Challenge Cup Committee, which had administered Barbadian cricket since its formation in 1892. The current president is Conde Riley.

Of the seven teams which participate in the inaugural season in 1892, four are still competing today – Lodge, Harrison College, Pickwick and Wanderers. From this small beginning the cricket fraternity has grown to such an extent that there are now 128 teams representing 82 clubs participating in the BCA's competitions.

The Barbados Cricket Association organizes cricket from the level of Under-13 Juniors to Test matches which it coordinates on behalf of the West Indies Cricket Board. The traditional domestic season now begins in May and concludes in December, the regional first-class season runs from January to March, and the international season begins in March and now extends through June.

From its earliest days Barbados has been renowned for the quality and calibre of its cricketers producing cricketers such as Challenor, Martindale, Weekes, Sobers, Hall. The teams dominate regional cricket, having won the regional championship on more than one occasion and this prowess has been transferred into the West Indies team.

Division 1 championship

2012 season
Clubs competing in the 2012 Elite Division championship. The 2011 championship was won by UWI.

LIME, YMPC and Banks were relegated to First Division for the 2012 season and Police was promoted. Barbados Youth are exempt from relegation.

Previous champions

See also
 List of Barbadian cricketers
 Barbados national cricket team
 Barbados Tridents
 Sport in Barbados

References

Further reading

External links
 Barbados Cricket Association – official site

Cricket in Barbados
Cricket
Sports organizations established in 1933
Cricket administration in the West Indies